Bethlehem is an unincorporated community in Winn Parish, Louisiana, United States.

Populated places in Ark-La-Tex
Unincorporated communities in Louisiana
Unincorporated communities in Winn Parish, Louisiana